Anne Mawathe is a Kenyan journalist. In 2014, she was shortlisted among the 28 finalists for the CNN Multichoice African Journalists Award.

References 

Living people
Kenyan journalists
Kenyan women journalists
Year of birth missing (living people)